The 2003 Central and Western District Council election was held on 23 November 2003 to elect all 15 elected members to the 19-member District Council. The pro-democracy camp won a majority of the seats where The Frontier/Civic Act-up legislator Cyd Ho Sau-lan defeated the incumbent Ip Kwok-him of the Democratic Alliance for the Betterment of Hong Kong, who was also a legislator, in Kwun Lung. The majority of the pro-democrats was balanced by 4 appointed members selected by the Chief Executive.

Overall election results
Before election:

Change in composition:

Results by constituency

Belcher

Castle Road

Centre Street

Chung Wan

Kennedy Town & Mount Davis

Kwun Lung

Middle Levels East

Peak

Sai Wan

Sai Ying Pun

Shek Tong Tsui

Sheung Wan

Tung Wah

University

Water Street

References

2003 Hong Kong local elections
Central and Western District Council elections